Palmižana is a small uninhabited village and tourist resort on the Croatian island of Sveti Klement (St. Clement) in the Adriatic Sea, located off the Dalmatian coast.

Sveti Klement island and Palmižana are geographically located in the Paklinski Islands archipelago and administratively they are part of the Split-Dalmatia County of Croatia.

Palmižana has a marina with room for 200 boats, a small shop and a tourist information office.

History 
The name is a misnomer and it comes from the word “Paklina”, which is a derivative of pine resin used for filling the gaps between the keel and the boat. During ancient times these island were used as ports for merchant and war navies of the ancient Phoenicians, Greeks, Romans and all other conquerors of these shores. From Venice until Libya there isn’t a place that offers such an abundance of shelter from any wind direction.

Tourism
Tourism on Palmižana was established in 1906 by Professor Eugen Meneghello on his 300-year-old estate. He imported exotic plants from all over the world and created the rare and magnificent botanical park. Eugen's son, Giorgio Meneghello Toto, one of world's best grouper fishers, built the island's complex and his wife, Dagmar (née: Gebauer), has been managing Palmižana for over 30 years. Currently, Dagmar manages Palmižana with the help of her three children and her grandson. Today, Palmizana iz well known for Vinogradice bay which is nautical center for many sailors in Croatia.

Plants and animals 
The rosemary, which blooms several times a year on every slope on Palmižana, filling the air with its heady scent, gave Palmizana its second name: "The Island of the Rosemary". Aloe, another plant, also grows everywhere. Also, palmizana is home for lizards and some snakes which are non-venomus.

Sites
This area of the Adriatic hides the greatest number of antique shipwrecks and places on the sea-bed where one can easily find amphore. The Meneghello family amphore collection is one of the biggest in the Adriatic because of this. The sea around the Palmižana is a treasury of fish, coral and incredibly beautiful undersea landscapes.

The botanical gardens of Palmižana are full of exotic plants, tree-like opuntias, agaves, numerous other cacti and succulents, mimosas, eucalyptuses, laurels, olives and different kinds of aromatic herbs and plants.

Cuisine
Exquisite traditional Palmižana cuisine is praised for its delicious specialities, based on fish, lobsters, scampi, shellfish and other seafood served with fresh vegetables from the island gardens. The cuisine has been declared one of the best in the Mediterranean by the German Magazine Boote, English Traveler and Croatian magazines Gloria and Playboy.

The Marina
ACI marina Palmižana lies in Palmižana Bay on the northeastern coast of St. Clement Island.  The marina is protected from all winds except those from the north and northeast, while strong south and southwest winds can cause swells. The marina has room for 200 boats and is open from the middle of March to the end of October.

The marina has 160 berths, all with water and power supply. The harbor has a reception facility, exchange office, restaurant, toilets and showers, and grocery store. The nearest gas station (2.5 Nm) is in the Hvar harbor (Križna luka). Since August, 1999, ACI marina Palmižana has continuous power supply and more power supply at the marina piers.

The marina is situated in one of the safest natural harbors on the Adriatic Sea, renowned for its safety since ancient times. It is situated 3,5 km from Hvar. It offers 190 moorings with optional connections to the water and electric power, telephone and VHF links.

External links
Palmizana Meneghello
Hotel Palmižana
Danielis Blog
Sailing Catamarans

Tourist attractions in Split-Dalmatia County
Populated places in Split-Dalmatia County
Seaside resorts in Croatia